The Canton of Laventie was one of the 14 cantons of the arrondissement of Béthune, in the Pas-de-Calais department, in northern France. It had 18,792 inhabitants in 2012. It was disbanded following the French canton reorganisation which came into effect in March 2015.

References

Laventie
2015 disestablishments in France
States and territories disestablished in 2015